Turricula sulcicancellata is a species of sea snail, a marine gastropod mollusk in the family Clavatulidae.

Description

Distribution
This marine species occurs off Cape Point, South Africa.

References

 Barnard K.H. (1958), Contribution to the knowledge of South African marine Mollusca. Part 1. Gastropoda; Prosobranchiata: Toxoglossa; Annals of The South African Museum v. 44 p. 73–163

External links
 Barnard K.H. (1958), Contribution to the knowledge of South African marine Mollusca. Part 1. Gastropoda; Prosobranchiata: Toxoglossa; Annals of The South African Museum v. 44 p. 73–163

Endemic fauna of South Africa
sulcicancellata
Gastropods described in 1958